Peter Tonkin (born 21 May 1948) is an Australian former swimmer. He competed in two events at the 1964 Summer Olympics.

References

External links
 

1948 births
Living people
Australian male breaststroke swimmers
Olympic swimmers of Australia
Swimmers at the 1964 Summer Olympics
Place of birth missing (living people)
20th-century Australian people